Lieutenant Colonel John Michael Woodhouse,  (29 September 1922 – 15 February 2008) was a British Army officer credited with helping to reform the Special Air Service.

Early years
John "Jock" Woodhouse was born in Kensington, London, on 29 September 1922, the only son of Brigadier Charles Woodhouse, a former Colonel of the Dorset Regiment. He received his education at Malvern College and commissioned into the Dorset Regiment in 1942.

Military career

Second World War
Woodhouse was not a member of the SAS during the Second World War, he fought in Tunisia, Sicily, and Italy. While commanding with 1st Battalion, East Surrey Regiment, he received his Military Cross for leading an attack on buildings occupied by tank crews which turned out to be the headquarters of the 16th Panzer Division.  In March 1944, a patrol he was commanding was ambushed near Cassino and he was taken prisoner. He became a Russian interpreter with the Allied Control Commission in Germany during the period 1947–49.

SAS years
Woodhouse joined the SAS in 1950. The initial results of the re-formed SAS were not as successful as had been hoped. After a period of active service, Woodhouse was chosen to return to the United Kingdom to establish a selection process for the SAS. The rigorous systems he developed over three years provided the basis of selection and training of the modern SAS.

He returned to Malaya as a squadron commander in 1955. He was appointed a Member of the Order of the British Empire in 1957 for his services in command of D Squadron 22nd SAS Regiment in Malaya. In 1958, he transferred from the Dorset Regiment to the Parachute Regiment and commanded a company in the 3rd battalion before being appointed second-in-command of 22 SAS in 1960. In 1962, he was chosen to command the regiment. Following the Brunei Revolt, it went to Malaysia in 1963 to address the Indonesian threat. Recalling the approach in Malaya, SAS teams organised jungle tribes to gather intelligence. In January 1964, Woodhouse launched one of his squadrons on Operation Claret with a mission to locate camps from which Indonesian incursions were launched, and to identify their routes into Sarawak. He convinced his SAS troopers that intelligence was of more long-term value than to inflict limited casualties. When Commonwealth forces brought the Indonesian incursions to an end in 1965, 22 SAS was withdrawn.

Brewing and later life
Upon retirement, Woodhouse joined the family business, Hall & Woodhouse Brewery, Blandford St Mary, Dorset, where from scratch, he created the successful children's soft drink brand, Panda Pops, becoming the managing director of this division. He was involved in local forestry management and, from 1976 to 1984, he served as chairman of the SAS Association.

External links
Dorset Echo obituary

1922 births
2008 deaths
British Army personnel of the Indonesia–Malaysia confrontation
British Army personnel of the Malayan Emergency
British Army personnel of World War II
Dorset Regiment officers
English brewers
Members of the Order of the British Empire
People educated at Malvern College
People from Kensington
Recipients of the Military Cross
Special Air Service officers
20th-century English businesspeople
Military personnel from London
British World War II prisoners of war
World War II prisoners of war held by Germany